Nogales International is a newspaper, based in Nogales, Arizona, United States, founded in 1925. It is published on Tuesdays and Fridays and is a division of Wick Communications. Nogales is located on the  U.S.–Mexico border. It is 60 miles south of Tucson, Arizona, and 150 miles south of Phoenix, Arizona. The International also publishes The Weekly Bulletin in Sonoita.

Nogales International reports on issues affecting residents of Santa Cruz County, Arizona, including  Nogales, Rio Rico,  Tumacacori,  Tubac,  Amado,  Patagonia,  Sonoita and  Elgin. Articles about issues and activities in Nogales, Sonora, Mexico, are also published.

References

External links
 Nogales International
 The Weekly Bulletin
 Wick Communications

Newspapers published in Arizona
Nogales, Arizona
Twin cities
 
Publications established in 1925